Bardzrashen is a village in the Ani Municipality of the Shirak Province of Armenia. It belongs to the municipal community of Maralik.

Demographics
The population of the village since 1873 is as follows:

References 

Populated places in Shirak Province